Lenox is an unincorporated community in Conecuh County, Alabama, United States. Lenox had a post office until it closed on June 13, 1998; it still has its own ZIP code, 36454. Joseph Ryals was the first postmaster who also owned the settlement's general store. It is claimed he named the location after a bar of Lenox soap, in order for the post office to be authorized.
Lenox is also home to young earth creationist Kent Hovind, as well as his Dinosaur Adventure Land ministry and amusement park.

References

Unincorporated communities in Conecuh County, Alabama
Unincorporated communities in Alabama